Dragon's Eye is a 1981 fantasy role-playing video game published by Automated Simulations for the Apple II, Atari 8-bit family, and Commodore PET.

Plot
Dragon's Eye is a game in which the player is a spell-using adventurer that a wizard hires to find the legendary Dragon's Eye.

Reception
Daniel Hockman reviewed the game for Computer Gaming World, and stated that "In the final analysis it is the individual combat system of Dragon's Eye that sets this game apart from others of similar type. It is very well done, challenging to play, and fun. If you like FRP style combat this is the game for you."

Rudy Kraft reviewed Dragon's Eye in The Space Gamer No. 48. Kraft recommended it, opining that it is "a very good game".

References

External links
Softalk
1984 Software Encyclopedia from Electronic Games
Book of Atari Software 1983

1981 video games
Apple II games
Atari 8-bit family games
Commodore PET games
Role-playing video games
Video games developed in the United States